"Smoke" is the fourth season premiere of the AMC television series Better Call Saul, a spin-off series of Breaking Bad. The episode aired on August 6, 2018, on AMC in the United States. Outside of the United States, the episode premiered on streaming service Netflix in several countries.

Plot

Opening 
In a flashforward, "Gene Takavic" has collapsed at the Omaha Cinnabon and is raced to the hospital, but is discharged after doctors confirm he did not suffer a heart attack. As Gene leaves, the receptionist stops him to obtain billing information. She has difficulty processing Gene’s identification, making him apprehensive, but she quickly realizes her mistake and corrects her error. Gene takes a taxi to the mall, where his car is parked, but becomes uneasy when he sees the driver making eye contact and he recognizes an Albuquerque Isotopes air freshener on the rearview mirror. He asks to be let out before reaching the mall, then walks quickly and anxiously around the corner and out of the driver's sight.

Main story 
Howard Hamlin calls Jimmy McGill and Kim Wexler about the fire at Chuck McGill's, and they arrive as Chuck's body is taken away. Jimmy sees the appliances outside Chuck's home and surmises his electromagnetic hypersensitivity symptoms had returned. He falls into a deep depression from which Kim tries to help him recover. Howard takes on the responsibility of arranging Chuck's funeral.

Mike Ehrmantraut receives his first payment from Madrigal Electromotive as a contracted security consultant, which Gus Fring arranged to launder the money Mike stole from the Salamancas. Though it was meant to be a paper transaction, Mike enters a Madrigal facility, performs a detailed inspection, and turns the results over to the manager with instructions to let Lydia Rodarte-Quayle know he was there.

Following Mike's advice, after Hector Salamanca's stroke Nacho Varga takes the fake capsules containing ibuprofen from Hector and replaces them with Hector's real nitroglycerin. He tries to dispose of the fakes but is interrupted by Gus, who says they need to meet with Juan Bolsa. Juan puts Nacho and Arturo in charge of the Salamanca operation for the time being. Afterward, Nacho drives to a bridge and throws the fakes away, unaware Victor has followed him.

Several of Chuck's friends and associates attend his funeral and give Jimmy their condolences. After the service, Howard tells Jimmy and Kim he believes he is responsible for Chuck’s death because he forced Chuck out of HHM after their malpractice insurance premium increased. Jimmy responds, "Well Howard, I guess that's your cross to bear", conceals his role in causing the increase, and immediately regains his happy-go-lucky demeanor.

Production 
In the opening scene, Saul is at his workplace, a Cinnabon mall store. Though set in Omaha, Nebraska, the flash-forward was filmed at the Cottonwood Mall in Albuquerque, New Mexico. The episode marks the first appearance of Jeff, played by Don Harvey.

Reception 
"Smoke" received critical acclaim from critics. On Rotten Tomatoes, it garnered a perfect 100% rating with an average score of 8.76/10 based on 17 reviews. The site consensus reads, "'Smoke' kicks off Better Call Sauls fourth season by finally shifting Jimmy's disturbing transition to Saul into full gear." Matt Fowler of IGN gave "Smoke" a positive review, with an 8.3/10.0 rating writing, "It's a heavy, reflective chapter that readily relies on silence to create both suspense and sorrow."

Ratings 
"Smoke" was watched by 1.77 million viewers in the United States on its original air date, fewer than the third-season finale which brought in 1.85 million American viewers.

Notes

References

External links 
 "Smoke" at AMC
 

Better Call Saul (season 4) episodes
Television episodes written by Peter Gould